Wright Opera House may refer to:

Wright Opera House Block, a building in Alma, Michigan
Wright's Opera House, a building in Ouray, Colorado